The 2016–17 Tercera División season is the fourth-tier football league of Mexico. The tournament began on 16 August 2016 and finished on 11 June 2017.

Competition format 
The Tercera División (Third Division) is divided into 14 groups. For the 2009/2010 season, the format of the tournament has been reorganized to a home and away format, which all teams will play in their respective group. The 14 groups consist of teams who are eligible to play in the liguilla de ascenso for one promotion spot, teams who are affiliated with teams in the Liga MX, Ascenso MX and Liga Premier, which are not eligible for promotion but will play that who the better filial team in an eight team filial playoff tournament for the entire season.

The league format allows participating franchises to rent their place to another team, so some clubs compete with a different name than the one registered with the FMF.

Group 1
Group with 14 teams from Campeche, Quintana Roo and Yucatán.

Teams

League table

Final stage

First round

Second round

Third round

 Group champion: Cantera Venados. Advance to Inter-groups stage.

Group 2
Group with 11 teams from Chiapas, Oaxaca, Tabasco and Veracruz.

Teams

League table

Final stage

Second round

Third round

 Group champion: Cruz Azul Lagunas. Advance to Inter-groups stage.

Group 3
Group with 18 teams from Hidalgo, Oaxaca, Puebla, San Luis Potosí and Veracruz.

Teams

League table

First round

Second round

Third round

 Group champion: Albinegros de Orizaba. Advance to Inter-groups stage.

Group 4
Group with 18 teams from Greater Mexico City and Puebla.

Teams

League table

Final stage

First round

Second round

Third round

 Group champion: Sporting Canamy. Advance to Inter-groups stage.

Group 5
Group with 13 teams from Mexico City and State of Mexico.

Teams

League table

Final stage

Second round

Third round

 Group champion: Histeria. Advance to Inter-groups stage.

Group 6
Group with 12 teams from Guerrero, Morelos, Puebla and State of Mexico.

Teams

League table

Final stage

Second round

{{TwoLegResult|Águilas UAGro||3–2|Artilleros Cuautla'||2–1|1–1}}

Third round

 Group champion: Alpha. Advance to Inter-groups stage.Group 7
Group with 19 teams from Hidalgo and Greater Mexico City.

Teams

League table

Final stage
First round

Second round

Third round

 Group champion: Pachuca. Advance to Inter-groups stage.Group 8
14 teams from Guanajuato, Guerrero, Michoacán and Querétaro.

Teams

League table

Final stage
 Second round 

Third round

 Group champion: Atlético Valladolid. Advance to Inter-groups stage.Group 9
Group with 18 teams from Aguascalientes, Guanajuato, Jalisco, Michoacán and Zacatecas.

Teams

League table

Final stage
 First round 

Second round

Third round

 Group champion: Mineros de Fresnillo. Advance to Inter-groups stage.Group 10
Group with 20 teams from Colima, Jalisco and Michoacán.

Teams

League table

Final stage
First round

Second round

Third round

 Group champion: Charales de Chapala. Advance to Inter-groups stage.Group 11
Group with 18 teams from Jalisco, Nayarit and Sinaloa.

Teams

League table

Final stage
First round

Second round

Third round

 Group champion: Tecos. Advance to Inter-groups stage.Group 12
Group with 18 teams from Coahuila, Nuevo León, San Luis Potosí and Tamaulipas. Atlético Linares, Cinco Estrellas and Tuneros de Matehuala did not participate in the second round and their matches were canceled.

Teams

League table

Final stage
First round

Second round

Third round

 Group champion: Saltillo Soccer. Advance to Inter-groups stage.Group 13
Group with 11 teams from Baja California Sur, Sinaloa and Sonora.

Teams

League table

Final stage
Third round

 Group champion: Águilas UAS. Advance to Inter-groups stage.Group 14
Group with 8 teams from Chihuahua, Coahuila and Durango.

Teams

League table

Final stage
Third round

 Group champion: Soles de Ciudad Juárez. Advance to Inter-groups stage.''

Promotion play-offs

Inter-groups stage

First leg

Second leg

Championship stage

Quarter-finals

Semi-finals

Final

Reserve Teams

Table

Last updated: April 30, 2017 Source: Liga TDPP = Position; G = Games played; Pts = Points; Pts/G = Ratio of points to games played; GD = Goal difference

Play-offs

See also 
Tercera División de México

References

External links 
 Official website of Liga TDP

Mx
1